WIXY (100.3 MHz) is a commercial FM radio station broadcasting a country music radio format.  Licensed to Champaign, Illinois, United States, the station serves the Champaign-Urbana area.  The station is currently owned by the Illini Radio Group subsidiary of Saga Communications under licensee Saga Communications of Illinois, LLC.  The radio studios and offices are on West Bradley Avenue in Champaign.

WIXY has an effective radiated power (ERP) of 13,000 watts.  The transmitter is on County Road 1700 East at County Road 900 North in Philo, Illinois.

HD Radio
WIXY broadcasts using HD radio technology.  It also had an FM translator, W221CK, on 92.1 MHz in Champaign.  During late 2009, these ran a new "WIXY Classic" country format.  In early January 2010, that format swapped with WXTT "eXtra 99.1" in Savoy; 99.1 changed its call sign to WYXY and picked up WIXY Classic, and the 92.1 WIXY-HD2 subcarrier and 92.1 translator changed branding to "WXTT eXtra 92.1"  The translator for WXTT later switched to 96.9 W245DP.  The active rock format is now known as "eXtra 96.9."

In May 2012, WIXY signed on an HD3 digital subchannel, and began airing a Top 40/CHR format branded as "Hits 99.7" (in reference to translator W259BG (99.7 FM), which dropped its simulcast of WIXY-HD2). On April 22, 2021, WIXY-HD3/W259BG changed to a soft adult contemporary format, branded as "EZ 99.7".

History
The call letters WIXY have been used off and on in other U.S. cities, most notably in Cleveland, Ohio; that station later became WCCR.  The current FM station was assigned the WIXY call sign by the FCC on December 13, 1991.  WIXY began broadcasting on June 1, 1992.

See also
 WYXY — sister station 99.1 WIXY Classic

References

External links
Saga Communications Stations
WIXY.com — official 100.3 analog/HD1 site
EZ 99.7 FM — official 100.3 HD3 and 99.7 W259BG website

IXY
Champaign, Illinois